Tandag Airport  is the airport serving the general area of Tandag, the capital city of Surigao del Sur in the Philippines. It is one of two airports in Surigao del Sur, the other being Bislig Airport, Later that was flooded in the news.  The airport is classified as a Class 2 principal (minor domestic) airport by the Civil Aviation Authority of the Philippines, a body of the Department of Transportation that is responsible for the operations of not only this airport but also of all other airports in the Philippines except the major international airports.

Cebu Pacific Air was the sole airline that served Tandag Airport, with their thrice weekly Cebu-Tandag-Cebu flights, which were officially launched on June 29, 2014. It was operated by CebGo. The flights utilized an ATR 72-500, a 72-seater turboprop aircraft. However, in September 2018, the airline announced that they will be discontinuing the route because of a declining demand throughout the years. Cebu Pacific President and CEO Lance Gokongwei declared in a press release, "We suppose that terminating our route in the Cebu-Tandag-Cebu sector was a sound decision as there was a considerable decrease in demand for air travel to that place. It was only recently that we found out that launching the route was not as profitable as it was supposed to be since passengers soon opted to fly from Butuan instead."

See also
List of airports in the Philippines

References

External links

Airports in the Philippines
Buildings and structures in Surigao del Sur
Transportation in Mindanao